is a junction railway station in the city of  Noshiro, Akita, Japan operated by the East Japan Railway Company (JR East). The station is also a freight depot for the Japan Freight Railway Company (JR Freight)

Lines
Higashi-Noshiro is served by the Ōu Main Line and Gonō Line.

Station layout
The station consists of one side platform and one island platform, connected to the station building by a footbridge. The station has automated ticket machines, Suica automated turnstiles as well as a  Midori no Madoguchi staffed ticket office.

Platforms

History
It was renamed  on November 1, 1909, and renamed Higashi-Noshiro Station on June 15, 1943. With the privatization of Japanese National Railways (JNR) on April 1, 1987, the station came under the control of JR East.

Passenger statistics
In fiscal 2018, the station was used by an average of 500 passengers daily (boarding passengers only).

See also
 List of railway stations in Japan

References

External links

 JR East station information 

Railway stations in Akita Prefecture
Ōu Main Line
Gonō Line
Railway stations in Japan opened in 1901
Noshiro, Akita
Stations of Japan Freight Railway Company